William Angel may refer to:

 William G. Angel (1790–1858), U.S. Representative for New York
 William P. Angel (1813–1869), American lawyer and politician from New York